Out of Many...One  is the debut album by Jamaican singer Tami Chynn. It was released through Universal Mowtown Records and SRC Records in the United States on August 7, 2006 and in Japan on September 8, 2006.

Chart performance
The album peaked at #41 on the Japanese Oricon charts with a total of 80,000 copies being sold in the country.

Track listing

Japanese edition bonus tracks
16. "Hyperventilating"  (T.O.K. remix)   (T.Chynn, T.Chin, C.Cunningham, C.Forte, Michael Jarrett, C.Marsh, Delano Thomas) – 3:19

17. "Looky Looky"  (Tony Kelly Remix)   (T.Chynn, T.Chin, C.Forte, T.Jackson, K.Kandekore, Tony Kelly) – 3:09

Credit
Producer: Tami Chynn, Kwame Kandekore, Ty "Tyjae" Jackson, Neil Case and Tessanne Chin
Executive Producer: Conroy Forte and Kwame Kandekore
Mixing Producer: Esco

Release history

Charts

References

Tami Chynn albums
2006 debut albums